Jennifer Grace Jones (née Bew; born 8 February 1948) is a Labour Party politician in the United Kingdom.

Jones was selected as a Labour candidate through an all-women shortlist.
She was elected as Member of Parliament in the 1997 general election for the Wolverhampton South West constituency, defeating the Conservative incumbent Nicholas Budgen with a majority of 5,118.  However, fairly early on in Labour's first term in government, she announced that she would not be seeking re-election at the 2001 election.  She was succeeded by Rob Marris.

Prior to entering Parliament, she worked as a social worker and had served on Wolverhampton Metropolitan Borough Council from 1991 to 1997.  In 2002 she was made an honorary fellow of the University of Wolverhampton.

References

External links 

Ex-MP Jenny Jones receives Honorary Fellowship award from the University of Wolverhampton (includes brief biography)
Guardian Unlimited Politics – Ask Aristotle: Jenny Jones MP
The Public Whip – Jenny Jones MP voting record

1948 births
Living people
People from Wolverhampton
Labour Party (UK) MPs for English constituencies
Female members of the Parliament of the United Kingdom for English constituencies
UK MPs 1997–2001
Alumni of the University of Wolverhampton
Councillors in Wolverhampton
20th-century British women politicians
21st-century British women politicians
20th-century English women
20th-century English people
21st-century English women
21st-century English people
Women councillors in England